Datuk Kasi K.L. Palaniappan is a prominent Malaysian businessman.

Born in 1958, he is a former architect and university professor. He founded MK Land with Mustapha Kamal Abu Bakar. He took over as managing director and acting chief executive in April 2006; share prices of the company subsequently doubled. In 2017 he was ousted from MK Land.

In 2007 Forbes Asia ranked him 40th on their list of 40 Richest Malaysians, with a personal wealth of US$127 million.

References

Malaysian businesspeople
Malaysian people of Indian descent
Tamil businesspeople
Businesspeople of Indian descent
Malaysian people of Tamil descent
Living people
Malaysian architects
Year of birth missing (living people)